Nana Abu Bonsra (born 17 march 1957) is a Ghanaian politician who served as the member of parliament for the Fomena Constituency.

Early life and education 
Nana was born on 17 March 1957. He hails from Dompoase a town in the Ashanti Region of Ghana. He obtained his BSc in design from the Kwame Nkrumah University of Science and Technology in 1981. He further had his Post graduate diploma in Architecture from the same university in 1985.

Career 
He is a development planner by profession. He is also an architect and a quantity surveyor.

Politics 
He is a member of New Patriotic Party. He was the member of parliament for Fomena Constituency in the Ashanti region of Ghana. This was for the 5th parliament of the 4th republic of Ghana. He obtained 11,787 votes out of the 16,650 valid votes cast equivalent to 70.8% of total votes cast. He won against Samuel Pinkrah of the National Democratic Congress, Augustine Kofi Tieku of the Democratic People's Party and James Kobina Seotah of the convention's People's Party. These obtained respectively 20.60%, 0.46% and 8.14% of total valid votes cast in the 2008 Ghana general elections for the Fomena Constituency.

Personal life 
Bonsra is a Christian and a member of the Methodist Church.

References 

Living people
1949 births
Ghanaian MPs 2009–2013
New Patriotic Party politicians
Ghanaian architects
People from Ashanti Region